Rotbold II (also Rothbold, Rotbald, Rodbald, Roubaud, or Rotbaud) (died 1014 or 1015) was the Count and Margrave of Provence from 1008 to his death. He was the only son of Rotbold I and Emilde, daughter of Stephen, Viscount of Gévaudan. He inherited all his father's titles on his death in 1008. He is an obscure person, difficult to differentiate from his father.

Family
Rotbald married Ermengarde of Burgundy. By her he left two sons and a daughter: 
 Hugh 
 William III of Provence 
 Emma, who married William III Taillefer, Count of Toulouse, and thus brought the margravial title in Provence to the House of Rouergue.

His widow Ermengard married Rudolf III of Burgundy  and she died .

References

1015 deaths
Counts of Provence
Year of birth unknown